Minnesota State Highway 16 (MN 16) is a  two-lane highway in southeast Minnesota, which runs from its interchange with Interstate Highway 90 in Dexter and continues east to its eastern terminus at the Wisconsin state line concurrent with U.S. Highways 14 and 61 outside La Crescent just west of La Crosse, Wisconsin.

The route was designated as a National Scenic Byway in 2003 as the Historic Bluff Country Scenic Byway.  The roadway follows the route of old U.S. Highway 16.

Route description

Minnesota Trunk Highway 16 serves as the scenic east–west route in southeast Minnesota. The national scenic byway links together Dexter, Grand Meadow, Spring Valley, Preston, Lanesboro, Rushford Village, Peterson, Rushford, Houston, Hokah, and La Crescent. Highway 16 parallels Interstate 90 throughout its route and allows travelers the opportunity to experience Minnesota's Driftless Area.

The route passes through the Richard J. Dorer Memorial Hardwood State Forest in Fillmore and Houston counties.

Forestville Mystery Cave State Park is located near Highway 16 in Fillmore County.  The park is located between Spring Valley and Preston.

The eastern terminus for Highway 16 is the Wisconsin state line at the Mississippi River outside La Crescent, concurrent with U.S. Highways 14 and 61.

The western terminus for the route is its interchange with Interstate 90 in Dexter.

History

State Highway 16 was designated in 1980.  The route was originally part of old U.S. Highway 16 from 1926 to 1980.

U.S. 16 was mostly replaced by Interstate Highway 90 within Minnesota.

State Highway 16 from Dexter to La Crescent is the only remaining section of this former U.S. route that exists as a trunk highway separate from Interstate 90.

After crossing the Mississippi River Bridge and the Wisconsin state line, old U.S. 16 continues on as Wisconsin Highway 16.

The only section of U.S. Highway 16 that remains in the present day is the east–west route between Rapid City, South Dakota and Yellowstone National Park in Wyoming.

Major intersections

References

016
 Minnesota
Transportation in Mower County, Minnesota
Transportation in Fillmore County, Minnesota
Transportation in Houston County, Minnesota